Joseph Nitya Nand is a Fijian politician and Member of the Parliament of Fiji for the FijiFirst Party. He served as the assistant Minister for Education, Heritage and Arts. He was elected to Parliament in the 2018 election.

References

Indian members of the Parliament of Fiji
FijiFirst politicians
Fijian educators
Government ministers of Fiji
Politicians from Macuata Province
Living people
Year of birth missing (living people)